Parvinder Singh (born 8 December 1981) is a cricketer who plays for Uttar Pradesh in Indian domestic cricket. He is a right-hand batsman and occasional medium pace bowler.

References

External links 

Indian cricketers
Uttar Pradesh cricketers
1981 births
Living people
Central Zone cricketers
Sportspeople from Meerut